City Creek is a stream in the U.S. state of South Dakota.

City Creek flows past the City of Deadwood, from which it derives its name.

See also
List of rivers of South Dakota

References

Rivers of Lawrence County, South Dakota
Rivers of South Dakota